The 1999–2000 Winston YUBA League was the 8th season of the YUBA League, the top-tier professional basketball league in Yugoslavia (later renamed to Serbia and Montenegro).

Teams 
A total of 12 teams participated in the 1999–2000 Winston YUBA League.

Distribution
The following is the access list for this season.

Promotion and relegation 
 Teams promoted from the YUBA B League
 Borac Čačak
 Ibon

 Teams relegated to the YUBA B League
 Zdravlje
 Iva Zorka

Venues and locations

Personnel and sponsorship

Regular season

Standings

Playoffs

Bracket 
Source

Clubs in European competitions

See also 
 1999–2000 ACB season
 1999–2000 Greek Basket League
 1999–2000 Slovenian Basketball League

References

1999–2000 in Yugoslav basketball
Serbia